Sean Murphy is a cryptographer, currently a professor at Royal Holloway, University of London. He worked on the NESSIE and ECRYPT projects. His notable research includes the cryptanalysis of FEAL and the Advanced Encryption Standard, and the use of stochastic and statistical techniques in cryptology. With Donald Davies he also developed Davies' attack on DES.

Murphy received his Ph.D. in mathematics in 1989 from the University of Bath.

References

External links
 Sean Murphy's page at RHUL

Living people
Academics of Royal Holloway, University of London
Alumni of the University of Bath
Modern cryptographers
Year of birth missing (living people)